The Bliss Rapids snail, scientific name Taylorconcha serpenticola, is a species of freshwater snail with a gill and an operculum, an aquatic gastropod mollusk in the family Hydrobiidae.

This species is endemic to Idaho in the United States.  Its natural habitat is rivers. It is threatened by habitat loss.

It is named after the Bliss Rapids on the Snake River as the river passes through the State of Idaho.

References

External links 
 Ecos info

Taylorconcha
Natural history of Idaho
Gastropods described in 1994
Taxonomy articles created by Polbot